Robert Krünert (14 April 1866 – 16 June 1945) was a German fencer. He competed at the 1906 and 1908 Summer Olympics.

References

1866 births
1945 deaths
German male fencers
Olympic fencers of Germany
Fencers at the 1906 Intercalated Games
Fencers at the 1908 Summer Olympics